In Māori tradition, Matahourua was the canoe of the legendary hero Kupe, who, in some accounts, was the discoverer of Aotearoa (New Zealand) (Craig 1989:161, Grey 1970:108, 161–3).

See also
List of Māori waka

References
R.D. Craig, Dictionary of Polynesian Mythology (Greenwood Press: New York, 1989).
G. Grey, Polynesian Mythology (reprint Taplinger Press: New York, 1970).

Māori waka
Māori mythology